The 1904 St. Louis Jain temple is a historic structure that was constructed for the 1904 St. Louis World's fairs, termed "Louisiana Purchase Exposition". It was the first building in the United States designated as a Jain temple, since it was a temple in India, although there were no Jains in the United States at that time. It later stood in Las Vegas where some members of the Los Angeles Jain community discovered it in 1980. It now stands within the Jain Center of Southern California in Los Angeles.

Louisiana Purchase Exposition
At the Louisiana Purchase Exposition it stood within the India pavilion. It was described thus:

"The pavilion, a reproduction of the famous mosque of Itmad-ul-Dowlah at Agra, India, was much admired, as were the interior decorations and exhibits. Rising from the center of the court was a Jain temple of teakwood .., being a copy of a white marble temple eight times as large at Palitana, Central India. The reproduction represented two years' work of sixty-five artists and was made expressly for the Louisiana Purchase Exposition.”

After the exposition, the temple was dismantled, but was not shipped back to India as originally planned.

Las Vegas
Hotelier Ben Jaffe, owner of the Castaways, acquired the temple and had it shipped to Las Vegas where it was reassembled by the hotel's pool for its opening on September 1, 1963. It was given the name Gateway to Luck. The image of the temple was widely used in the hotel's postcards. The site is now occupied by The Mirage.

In Los Angeles
The Jain Center of Southern California was established in 1979, with Mahendra Khandar as the President. In 1980, Lalit Shah and Shirish Seth visited Las Vegas and discovered the temple. In 1981, some of the Jains accompanied by Acharya Sushil Kumar and Chitrabhanu saw the temple, and agreed that the temple should belong to a Jain organization. Lalit Shah, then vice-president of the Jain Center of Southern California  approached the Castaways manager Bill Friedman. He offered to have the value of the Temple appraised and sell it to them. The Jains instead requested the estate of  Howard Hughes to donate it to them. In 1987, Castaways was bought by Steve Wynn. Castaways was demolished to make place for the new 3,044-room megaresort Mirage. In 1995, the 1600 parts were transported to Los Angeles.

In 2004, the Southern California Jain Center initiated reconstruction of the 42,000 square feet center. The wood temple has been carefully restored with the assistance of Manubhai Shah and MS International who carefully studied how the temple would be put together again. The coating put on it at Las Vegas was removed to restore the original teak look. The structure is 15 ft x 20 ft x 35 ft high and weighs nearly 10,000 lbs. It now forms the centerpiece of the center.  In 2008 the new building was inaugurated.

Artistic significance
The 1904 St. Louis temple is not only one of a kind in USA, but is a rare surviving example of Indian tradition of wooden architecture. It has been suggested that it was originally carved at the Ahmadabad Woodcarving Company jointly run by  Muggenbhai Hutheesing of Ahmedabad and Lockwood de Forest, a painter, orientalist and interior architect of New York City.

Location
The temple is located within the Jain Center at Buena Park, California.

See also

Jainism in America
JAINA
Jain Center of Southern California
Brampton Jain Temple

References

External links

Indian-American culture in Los Angeles
Jain temples in the United States
Buena Park, California
Religious buildings and structures in Los Angeles
Jainism in the United States
20th-century Jain temples
Asian-American culture in Missouri
Indian-American culture in Missouri
1904 establishments in Missouri
Buildings and structures in St. Louis